Garnett-Paul Thompson Spears (December 3, 2008 – January 23, 2014) was a 5-year-old boy who died at a hospital in suburban Valhalla, New York. He was murdered by his mother, Lacey Spears, who injected him with high levels of sodium, leading to swelling in his brain.

Murder case
After his death, Garnett's mother, Lacey Spears, was charged with second-degree murder and first-degree manslaughter of her 5-year-old son. On March 2, 2015, a jury found Spears guilty of murdering her son by poisoning him with table salt, which she had administered to him from infancy through his feeding tube. On April 8, 2015, a judge sentenced Spears to 20 years to life in prison for the death of her son. The judge in the case, Robert Neary, acknowledged that Lacey Spears suffers from Munchausen syndrome by proxy, and therefore did not sentence her to the maximum of 25 years in prison before parole eligibility. Her murder conviction was upheld in state appellate court and the state's highest court declined to review her conviction. , she is imprisoned at the Bedford Hills Correctional Facility for Women, and eligible for parole no earlier than June 12, 2034.

Lacey Spears
Lacey Spears was born and raised in Decatur, Alabama. Lonely as a single mother and desperate for attention, Lacey constantly posted on social media about her son's health struggles, even going so far as to start a blog devoted to chronicling her search for a cure for whatever illnesses plagued him. Telling friends she wanted to leave Alabama, Lacey moved with Garnett to Florida to live with her maternal grandmother, Peggy. Eventually, she moved with her son to the town of Chestnut Ridge, New York, 14 months prior to Garnett's death. In New York, Lacey and Garnett lived in a community called The Fellowship for elderly and disabled people. In explaining her son's paternity, she created a fictional character, police officer Blake, who died in a car accident, to be Garnett's father. She lied to Garnett's biological father, Chris Hill, that Garnett was not his son and threatened him to keep distance from her and Garnett.

In Media

My Sweet Angel: The True Story of Lacey Spears, the Seemingly Perfect Mother Who Murdered Her Son in Cold Blood (2016) by John Glatt published by St. Martin's Press

 Deadliest Mums & Dads S02E02 "The Poisoning of Garnett Spears" 

 Investigation Discovery show Web of Lies S03E03 "The Sick Boy"

See also 

Crime in New York
List of poisonings
Julie Gregory, an Ohio woman who wrote a memoir in 2003, Sickened, about her mother's Munchausen-by-proxy abuse of her, which she tried to report to various health professionals.
Wendi Michelle Scott, a Maryland woman with Munchausen-by-proxy who injected her four-year-old daughter with magnesium in 2007 and was sentenced to prison in 2008.
Murder of Dee Dee Blanchard, a Missouri woman with Munchausen-by-proxy who was killed by her daughter and her daughter's boyfriend in 2015.
Murder of Olivia Gant, a 2017 case in which a seven-year-old girl was killed by her mother through numerous acts of medical abuse, deemed Munchausen-by-proxy and medical fraud.
 Shauna Taylor Case, deliberate destruction of a child's liver caused by her mother in an act of Munchausen by proxy and intentional poisoning.

References 

2014 crimes in New York (state)
2014 murders in the United States
Deaths by person in New York (state)
Deaths by poisoning
January 2014 crimes in the United States
Murder in New York (state)
Incidents of violence against boys